Zee Cinema is a Canadian Category B Hindi language  specialty channel and is owned by Ethnic Channels Group.

Zee Cinema broadcasts programming primarily from the library of Zee Cinema a Bollywood film channel from India. Programming includes classic and contemporary films and film-related television series.

History
On March 2, 2012, Ethnic Channels Group was granted approval from the Canadian Radio-television and Telecommunications Commission (CRTC) to launch a television channel called Bollywood SD – Hindi Movie Channel, described as "a national, niche third-language ethnic specialty Category B service devoted predominantly to Hindi movies and targeted to the Hindi-speaking community in Canada."

Previous to Bollywood SD – Hindi Movie Channel launching, the Zee Cinema brand existed in Canada since 2005 through a partnership with Asian Television Network and a subsidiary of Zee Entertainment Enterprises, who launched a Canadian version of Zee Cinema called ATN Zee Cinema.

ATN Zee Cinema was renamed ATN Movies OK on July 25, 2012. That same month after the rebrand, Bollywood SD – Hindi Movie Channel was launched as Zee Cinema through a newly formed licensing partnership between Ethnic Channels Group and a subsidiary of Zee Entertainment Enterprises.

References

External links
 Zee Cinema Canada
 Zee Cinema

Digital cable television networks in Canada
Television channels and stations established in 2012
Hindi-language television in Canada